The 1963–64 season was Mansfield Town's 27th season in the Football League and 3rd in the Third Division, they finished in 7th position with 51 points.

Final league table

Results

Football League Third Division

FA Cup

League Cup

Squad statistics
 Squad list sourced from

References
General
 Mansfield Town 1963–64 at soccerbase.com (use drop down list to select relevant season)

Specific

Mansfield Town F.C. seasons
Mansfield Town